City State of the World Emperor is a supplement for fantasy role-playing games published by Judges Guild in 1980.

Contents
City State of the World Emperor is a campaign setting describing the ancient city of Viridestan and the surrounding area in three books: "City" (80 pages), "Shops" (80 pages), and "Guidebook to Map 6" (Wilderness Map 6). It includes history, background, rules guidelines, a new character class, and three maps.  All the NPCs in every location have full ability score listings.

This is an extension of the Judges Guild series of maps which all link together. Each has various cities, characters, and phenomena described in their accompanying booklets. This is the largest, most complex one. It is not a scenario or programmed adventure, it just establishes the scenery, politics, and major NPCs in an area which referees can use for their adventures."

Publication history
City State of the World Emperor was written by Creighton Hippenhammer and Bob Bledsaw, and was published by Judges Guild in 1980 as 3 books (two of which were 80 pages, the other 48 pages), three large maps, and a cover sheet.

A listing of cumulative sales from 1981 shows that City State of the World Emperor sold over 20,000 units.

Reception
Ron Pehr reviewed The City State of the World Emperor in The Space Gamer No. 34. Pehr commented that "What we have here is a big-time, industrial-grade playing aid... It does an excellent job. Unless you play all day every day, it will be a long time before your players can fully explore every facet of the City State of the World Emperor (CSWE). The city map itself is larger than that of their previous City State of the Invincible Overlord, and my players haven't exhausted it in 4 years. The CSWE's territories have plenty of interesting terrain ruled by formidable characters." He continued, "On the negative side, many of the areas are described in only a sketchy paragraph, some of the descriptions of NPCs and their environs seem to have been drawn up at random, and that beginning referees who introduce some of the overpowering NPCs and magic artifacts that are 'on the list' will either overwhelm player-characters or provide too many goodies too soon (a general fault with D&D anyhow)." Pehr concluded his review by saying, "CWSE does accomplish what it set out to do. It provides a relatively complete background world, with exquisite detail in places, and unending ideas for development of a referee's own world. The price is high, but you get a lot of material for it."

Patrick Amory reviewed City-State of the World Emperor for Different Worlds magazine and stated that "City-State of the World Emperor is vast, its sheer bulk will provide years of play. The detail is tremendous, and far surpasses anything else on the market. It will, however, require much work on the GM's part to safely build it into a good campaign."

Lawrence Schick in his book Heroic Worlds states that "If you think quantity is quality, this is for you."

Reviews
 Different Worlds #8 (Jun 1980)
 Gryphon #1 (Summer 1980)
 Gryphon #3 (Spring 1981)

References

Judges Guild fantasy role-playing game supplements
Role-playing game supplements introduced in 1980